Dimethomorph is a fungicide with systemic function. It is used for treating mildew and root rot caused by organisms such as Pythium  and Phytophthora species.

References

Fungicides